Huazhong Agricultural University (HZAU) is a public university in Wuhan, giving priority to agriculture, characterized by life sciences and supplemented by the combination of agriculture, basic sciences, engineering, liberal arts, law, economic trade, and management. HAU, one of the first groups of universities in China which are authorized to confer Ph.D. and M.A. degrees, has produced the new China's first doctor majoring in agronomy. Firmly adhering to the two central tasks like teaching and scientific research, HAU maintains its management by levels and flexible forms. As far as education quality and academic level, HAU ranks first among the agricultural universities in China. In addition, it has been converted into a nationally important base for training senior special agricultural personnel and developing agricultural science and technology. It is a Chinese state Double First Class University Plan university, identified by the Ministry of Education.

Colleges 
HAU comprises 13 colleges (Life Sciences and Technology, Plant Sciences and Technology, Animal Sciences and Technology, Veterinary Medicine, Horticulture and Forestry Sciences, Resources and Environment, Fishery, Food Science, Economics and Management, Humanities and Social Sciences, Engineering Technology, Basic Sciences) and the Foreign Languages Department.

As a national key university, HAU is directly affiliated to the Ministry of Education of China. There are 48 undergraduate specialties, 87 master specialties, 54 doctoral specialties, and 7 post-doctoral mobile stations. In addition, there are six National Emphatic Subjects and two National Labs.

Ranking

According to China alumni network, HAU was ranked 44th in 2014. Its horticulture was ranked No.1. Crop science, animal science and veterinary medicine were ranked No.2 nationally. In 2017, Academic Ranking of World Universities ranked it between 401st-500th in the world. In 2018, Times Higher Education put Huazhong Agricultural University on the rank of 601-800 in the world, the 29th in China.

History 
Huazhong Agricultural University (HAU) has a history of over 100 years. Its predecessor, Huazhong Agricultural College (HAC), termed Hubei Agricultural College in 1940, was derived from Hubei Farming School (HFS) established in 1898 by Zhang Zhidong, governor-general of the Huguang region. In 1952 when China's high institutions were restructured HAC was founded, merging Agricultural College of Wuhan University with Hubei Agricultural College, the Agricultural College of Henan University, the Agricultural College of Nanchang University, the Agricultural College of Guangxi University, the Agricultural College of Zhongshan University and some departments of Hunan Agricultural College. HAC had its name changed to HAU in 1985.

HAU's new library opened in 2006, premises area of 31,136 square meters. Library construction and beautiful overall, coordinated, and the museum now has 10 large bays, open reading room, more than 3,500 reading seats. The library provides students, for a 40 yuan a month, VIP self-study services in a small room with air conditioning.

References

External links

Official website 
Student's BBS 

 
Universities and colleges in Wuhan
Agricultural universities and colleges in China